Carolina Griño-Aquino  (October 22, 1923 – December 24, 2012) was a Filipino judge. She served as a Presiding Justice of the Court of Appeals of the Philippines prior to being appointed to the Supreme Court of the Philippines by President Corazon Aquino in 1988. She served on the Supreme Court as an Associate Justice from February 2, 1988 until October 22, 1993. Griño-Aquino was the fourth woman after Associate Justices Cecilia Muñoz-Palma, Ameurfina Melencio-Herrera and Irene Cortes.

Early life and education
She was born on October 22, 1923 in the town of Leganes, Iloilo. She graduated magna cum laude with a liberal arts degree from the Colegio de San Agustin (the present-day University of San Agustin) in Iloilo City. Griño-Aquino then obtained a law degree from the University of the Philippines in 1950. She placed first in the 1950 Bar Exams with a score of 92.02 percent.

Later years
Following her retirement from the Supreme Court in 1993, Griño-Aquino became the first Chairperson of the Mandatory Continuing Legal Education Committee. The Supreme Court also appointed Griño-Aquino as a member or leader of several investigations, including the probe of the Bar Exam leakage in 2003, the GSIS-Meralco bribery case in 2008, and the investigation of the Integrated Bar of the Philippines elections in 2009.

Personal life
Her husband, former Chief Justice of the Supreme Court of the Philippines Ramon Aquino, served on the Court from 1985 to 1986.

Death
Carolina Griño-Aquino died from a long illness on December 24, 2012, at the age of 89.

See also
 Court of Appeals of the Philippines
 Associate Justice of the Supreme Court of the Philippines

References

1923 births
2012 deaths
Associate Justices of the Supreme Court of the Philippines
University of the Philippines alumni
Filipino women lawyers
Justices of the Court of Appeals of the Philippines
Filipino women judges
People from Iloilo
20th-century women judges